Fort Calhoun is a city in Washington County, Nebraska, United States. The population was 908 at the 2010 census.   The city includes Fort Atkinson, the first fort built west of the Missouri River.

History
Fort Calhoun was platted in 1855. It was named for John C. Calhoun.

Geography

Demographics

2010 census
As of the census of 2010, there were 908 people, 391 households, and 253 families living in the city. The racial makeup of the city was 96.7% White, 0.2% African American, 0.2% Native American, 0.1% Asian, 0.1% Pacific Islander, 0.7% from other races, and 2.0% from two or more races. Hispanic or Latino of any race were 3.2% of the population.

There were 391 households, of which 28.4% had children under the age of 18 living with them, 49.9% were married couples living together, 11.0% had a female householder with no husband present, 3.8% had a male householder with no wife present, and 35.3% were non-families. 32.7% of all households were made up of individuals, and 15.3% had someone living alone who was 65 years of age or older. The average household size was 2.32 and the average family size was 2.95.

The median age in the city was 41.4 years. 24.9% of residents were under the age of 18; 4.6% were between the ages of 18 and 24; 24.1% were from 25 to 44; 30.8% were from 45 to 64; and 15.7% were 65 years of age or older. The gender makeup of the city was 51.4% male and 48.6% female.

2000 census
As of the census of 2000, there were 856 people, 342 households, and 229 families living in the city. The population density was 1,380.5 people per square mile (533.1/km2). There were 375 housing units at an average density of 604.8 per square mile (233.5/km2). The racial makeup of the city was 98.48% White, 0.58% African American, 0.12% Native American, 0.12% from other races, and 0.70% from two or more races.  Hispanic or Latino of any race were 1.29% of the population.

There were 342 households, out of which 36.3% had children under the age of 18 living with them, 54.7% were married couples living together, 8.8% had a female householder with no husband present, and 33.0% were non-families. 30.4% of all households were made up of individuals, and 15.5% had someone living alone who was 65 years of age or older. The average household size was 2.50 and the average family size was 3.16.

In the city, the population was spread out, with 27.9% under the age of 18, 7.6% from 18 to 24, 27.3% from 25 to 44, 22.7% from 45 to 64, and 14.5% who were 65 years of age or older. The median age was 37 years. For every 100 females, there were 94.5 males. For every 100 females age 18 and over, there were 87.5 males.

As of 2000 the median income for a household in the city was $41,500, and the median income for a family was $57,679. Males had a median income of $36,250 versus $25,000 for females. The per capita income for the city was $20,779. About 3.1% of families and 3.8% of the population were below the poverty line, including 4.1% of those under the age of 18 and 6.0% of those 65 and older.

See also 
 Washington County Historical Association
 National Register of Historic Places listings in Washington County, Nebraska
 History of Nebraska

References

External links
 City website

Cities in Nebraska
Cities in Washington County, Nebraska
Forts along the Missouri River
1855 establishments in Nebraska Territory